Chirwon Je clan was one of the Korean clans. Their Bon-gwan was in Haman County, South Gyeongsang Province. According to the research in 2015, the number of Chirwon Je clan was 20095. Their founder was  who was a politician in Han dynasty. Zhuge Chung, a great-grandchild of Zhuge Liang, came over to Silla during 13th king Michu of Silla’s reign.

See also 
 Korean clan names of foreign origin

References

External links 
 

 
Korean clan names of Chinese origin